Penha may refer to:

Places
Penha, Santa Catarina, a municipality in Santa Catarina, Brazil
Penha, Rio de Janeiro, a neighborhood in Rio de Janeiro, Brazil
Penha Circular, a neighborhood in Rio de Janeiro, Brazil
Subprefecture of Penha, São Paulo, Brazil
Penha (district of São Paulo), Brazil
Penha de França, Goa, a town in Bardez, Goa, India
Penha de França, a parish in Lisbon, Portugal
Penha Hill, a hill in Macau, China

Other uses
Penha Convent in Vila Velha, Espírito Santo, Brazil
Penha (São Paulo Metro)